Malatya Turgut Özal University, shortened MTÜ, is a public university in Malatya, Turkey which was formed on 18 May 2018 by the separation from Inönü University.

As of 2021, the university has 6 faculties, 2 colleges, 1 institute and 8 vocational schools.

History 
In 2018, some faculties which have been separated from Inönü University in accordance with the law no 7141 such as Faculty of Agriculture, Faculty of Engineering and Natural Sciences, Faculty of Business Administration and Management, Faculty of Design and Architecture, as well as Civil Aviation School, have become a part of newly established Malatya Turgut Özal University.

Malatya Turgut Özal University (MTÜ), one of the two universities in Malatya, was founded in memory of Turkey's 8th President, Turgut Özal, born in Malatya.

Academics

Institutes 

 Graduate School

Faculties 

 Faculty of Engineering and Natural Sciences
 Faculty of Business Administration and Management
 Faculty of Design and Architecture
 Faculty of Agriculture
 Faculty of Health Sciences
 Faculty of Medicine

Colleges 

 Civil Aviation School
 School of Foreign Languages

Vocational schools 

 Akçadağ Vocational School
 Arapgir Vocational School
 Battalgazi Vocational School
 Doğanşehir Vahap Küçük Vocational School
 Darende Bekir Ilıcak Vocational School
 Kale Tourism and Hotel Management Vocational School
 Hekimhan Mehmet Emin Sungur Vocational School
 Yesilyurt Vocational School

See also 

 List of universities in Turkey

References

External links 

 Malatya Turgut Özal University Official Website (in English)

Universities and colleges in Turkey
Educational institutions established in 2018
2018 establishments in Turkey